Sir William Hart Dyke, 7th Baronet PC, DL, JP (7 August 1837 – 3 July 1931) was an English Conservative politician and tennis pioneer.

Background and education
The second son of Sir Percival Hart Dyke, 6th Baronet and Elizabeth Wells, Hart Dyke was educated at Windlesham House School, Harrow School and Christ Church, Oxford. He graduated M.A. in 1864. He was described as "one of the best amateur rackets players of his day". In 1862, won the Rackets World Championships from a professional player (Francis Erwood) at the Prince's Club, which was the former headquarters of rackets. In 1873 he played lawn tennis in a significant early match with John Moyer Heathcote and Julian Marshall at his home of Lullingstone Castle. In 1875 with Heathcote he was a member of the Marylebone Cricket Club committee that framed the original set of rules for tennis.

Political career

Hart Dyke was Conservative Member of Parliament for West Kent between 1865 and 1868, for Mid Kent between 1868 and 1885 and for Dartford between 1885 and 1906. He was a Conservative whip from 1868 to 1874, and held ministerial office under Benjamin Disraeli as Parliamentary Secretary to the Treasury from 1874–1880 and under Lord Salisbury as Chief Secretary for Ireland from 1885 to 1886 and as Vice-President of the Committee of the Council on Education from 1887 to 1892. He succeeded his father to the baronetcy in 1875, and was appointed a Privy Counsellor in 1880.

Family
Hart Dyke married Lady Emily Caroline Montague, daughter of the 7th Earl of Sandwich, in 1870. He died in July 1931, aged 93, and was succeeded in the baronetcy by his fourth and only surviving son, Oliver. Oliver was married to Zoe Dyke who farmed silk worms. The elder Lady Hart Dyke survived her husband by only a month and died in August 1931.

References

External links 
 

1837 births
1931 deaths
Alumni of Christ Church, Oxford
Baronets in the Baronetage of England
Conservative Party (UK) MPs for English constituencies
Deputy Lieutenants of Kent
English justices of the peace
Members of the Privy Council of Ireland
Members of the Privy Council of the United Kingdom
People educated at Harrow School
UK MPs 1865–1868
UK MPs 1868–1874
UK MPs 1874–1880
UK MPs 1880–1885
UK MPs 1885–1886
UK MPs 1886–1892
UK MPs 1892–1895
UK MPs 1895–1900
UK MPs 1900–1906
Presidents of the Marylebone Cricket Club
English cricketers
Gentlemen of Kent cricketers
Chief Secretaries for Ireland
World rackets champion
People educated at Windlesham House School
People from Lullingstone